The Acura RL is a mid-size luxury car that was manufactured by the Acura division of Honda for the 1996–2012 model years over two generations. The RL was the flagship of the marque, having succeeded the Acura Legend, and was replaced in 2013 by the Acura RLX. All models of the Legend, RL and RLX lines have been adapted from the Japanese domestic market Honda Legend. The model name "RL" is an abbreviation for "Refined Luxury."

The first-generation Acura RL was a rebadged version of the third-generation Honda Legend, and was first introduced to the North American market in 1996, to replace the second-generation Acura Legend. The second-generation Acura RL was a rebadged version of the fourth-generation Honda Legend, introduced to the North American market in September 2004, as a 2005 model. This iteration of the RL received an extensive mid-generational facelift for the 2009 model year, and a further update for 2011. The third-generation debuted for the 2014 model year as the Acura RLX.


First generation (1996–2004)

1996 (KA9)
In 1996, Acura introduced the Acura 3.5RL, known internally as "KA9," to replace the Legend. Acura dropped the Legend name when market research showed that consumers referred to Acura products by their model names, "Legend" and "Integra," and did not necessarily associate the names with Honda's "Acura" brand.

The 3.5RL's longitudinally mounted V6 engine had its center-line mounted in-line with the car's axis, and not transversely (i.e., 90 degrees offset from the vehicle axis) like most other front-wheel-drive cars.  This longitudinal placement allowed for a smaller turning radius and easy in-town maneuverability, as well as 56/44 front/rear weight distribution.

In late 1998, the 1999 3.5RL received a front and rear facelift with integrated foglights, revised bumpers and hood, as well as driver and front passenger side-impact airbags. The suspension and chassis were stiffened, and new alloy wheels were offered.

In 1999, a larger navigation system screen was added for the 2000 model year. Along with that larger screen came the conversion to easy-to-replace DVD map databases. In 2001, the 2002 model year 3.5RL received painted lower trim and mudflaps along with redesigned alloys and a newer, sportier suspension setup. More insulation was added in the engine compartment for 2002. In 2004, RL's received clear turn signal lenses in the rear lights, another new alloy wheel design, and various interior upgrades including new color schemes. For model year 2004, the 3.5RL offered as standard equipment a revised navigation system and integrated satellite radio in addition to a redesigned center console and chrome door lock pulls. The 2004 3.5RL was the first production saloon car to offer satellite radio as standard equipment.

The 1996–2004 3.5RL's engine was the last in the Acura lineup not to use Honda's variable valve timing system (VTEC), This 3.5 L 90-degree V6 engine was internally designated as the C35A, and was the last of the Honda C engine V6 engines used in Honda and Acura lineups, being replaced by the newer Honda J engine 60-degree V6 engines. The 2004 RL was also the last Acura to use the numeric designation (i.e., 3.5) for its engine displacement.

Second generation (2005–2013)

2005 (KB1)

The new-generation car, known internally as "KB1," was launched in late 2004 for the 2005 model year. Without the rumored V8 engine, it featured an all-wheel drive system marketed by Acura as "Super Handling-All Wheel Drive" (SH-AWD). It integrated active differentials with the all-wheel-drive system and traction control to improve handling, similar to the "ATTS" system featured on the 1997 Honda Prelude SH. At the time of its introduction, the Acura RL's SH-AWD was the first all-wheel-drive system to vary the distribution of power not only from front to back, but also side to side in the rear using a technique called torque vectoring.  The RL can direct up to 70% of available torque to the rear wheels, and up to 100% of that available rear torque can be directed to just one wheel.  In combination with a specially designed planetary gear-set which can over-drive the rear wheels at up to 5% greater speed than the front wheels, the torque directed to one wheel, or torque vectoring, can have a steering effect.  As the car speeds around a curve, torque vectored to the outside rear wheel will push the rear end around the curve faster, just as paddling the outside oar of a row boat faster than the inside oar will cause the row boat to turn, to minimize the understeer common in front-heavy vehicles.

The first-generation RL had been powered by the 225 hp (168 kW) 90-degree C-series non-VTEC V6 engine. The second-generation RL used a newer design 60-degree J-series 3.5 L V6 SOHC VTEC engine delivering , (later revised to  due to amended SAE testing procedures). To give the car a more sporty feel, the car featured drive-by-wire throttle control and a five-speed sequential sport shifting automatic transmission with shift paddles mounted on the steering wheel. As with the first-generation Acura RL, the second-generation Acura RL required premium unleaded fuel rated at 91 (R+M)/2 octane.

A first for the RL was the use of aluminum 4-piston front brake calipers over 12.6-inch cast-iron ventilated front rotors. These multi-piston calipers, derived from racing applications, are extremely rigid. In the rear, 12.2-inch cast-iron ventilated discs attached to their hub with lightweight aluminum collets and were gripped by one-piston aluminum brake calipers.  The RL was equipped with unique five-spoke 17-inch alloy wheels and Michelin Pilot HX MXM 4 245/50-R-17 98V all season grand touring tires.  These wheels were one inch larger in diameter, and the tires 20 mm wider in section, than those found on the first-generation Acura RL.

New features on the 2005 RL included a keyless entry system that allowed the driver to both lock and unlock the car by touching the door handle without having to use the remote control, and a keyless start system.  A new 260 watt, ten speaker Bose DVD-Audio 5.1 sound system equalized for the RL cabin featured several Bose technologies.  Bose AudioPilot is a noise compensation technology which analyzes background environmental cabin noise and uses an algorithm based on cabin acoustics to boost certain portions of the musical signal so that it may be heard more clearly above environmental sound "clutter" without any apparent change in volume.  Bose Centerpoint processes stereo and matrix surround sound recordings to allow play through the 5.1 sound system even though the source may only be a stereo sound track. Bose Active Noise Cancellation (ANC) rounded out the suite.  The ANC was always on, whether the stereo was on or not.  The ANC took input from two microphones placed in the cabin to analyze drivetrain-related low-frequency sound waves entering the cabin.  The ANC sent information to the sound system to create a precisely shaped and timed reverse-phased audio signal from the door speakers and the subwoofer. The result was a dramatic reduction in perceived engine and exhaust noise.

XM Satellite Radio, integrated Bluetooth hands-free technology for wireless phone use, voice recognition technology with over 560 voice commands to control navigation system and displays, wireless phone, audio system, heating and ventilation controls rounded out the cabin's technological features. Heating and air conditioning systems were tied into a solar sensor and GPS positioning so that cabin temperature remained constant in a mixed sun and shade situation.  Based on sun position and cabin orientation, the system could automatically send additional cooling air to the sunny side of the car to keep that occupant comfortable, while not freezing out the occupant on the shady side.

The Alpine Electronics DVD-based navigation system was integrated with an 8-inch LCD display and a multi-use Interface Dial, which could move up, down, left and right like a mouse, turn like a knob, scroll through preset menus, and click when pushed to act as a selector button.  Unlike many in-car navigation systems, the Alpine DVD-based navigation unit allowed the driver to change destinations and routes "on the fly" while driving, rather than being locked out unless the car was in Park. The tightly integrated voice recognition system worked with the navigation system and could recognize spoken city and street names. Also unique at the time was two-way communication via AcuraLink satellite communication. Using a facility of XM Radio service, the system could send a variety of messages to the car, including service appointment reminders (appointments first made via Internet) or important messages such as recall notices. The use of OnStar was carried over from the previous generation RL. Use of digital/analog trimode (two digital bands and one analog band) technology allowed the 2005 RL OnStar technology to survive the planned 2007 phase-out of the analog OnStar to fully digital OnStar service.

Other new RL features included the Active Front Lighting System, in which the high intensity discharge headlamps swiveled in concert with the steering up to twenty degrees, for improved night cornering vision.  Light emitting diodes (LED) replaced traditional incandescent bulbs in the tail and brake lights, the turn signals integrated in the side mirror housings, and many interior cabin lights.

The 2005 RL was also the first Honda vehicle to use the Advanced Compatibility Engineering (ACE) body structure, which has since proliferated throughout every newly introduced Honda and Acura vehicle design. The ACE structure features extensive use of high-tensile steel and lightweight aluminum components in a front-mounted polygonal main frame, designed to engage vehicles of differing size and weight in a frontal collision and spread the forces through multiple structural pathways, while preventing or minimizing cabin deformation. In practical terms, this means in an SUV versus ACE structure car collision, there is a greater chance that the ACE body structure will engage with the SUV's frame and dissipate collision forces around the passenger compartment. In more conventional non-ACE car structures, the SUV frame has a much greater chance of missing or over-riding the conventional car's major structural components and a greater chance of deforming the passenger compartment.

The 2005 RL car structure used aluminum alloy in the hood, front fenders, trunk lid and frame, front and rear subframes, suspension arms, front knuckles and bumper beams. Magnesium was used in the intake manifold, and the two-piece center drive shaft was made of a carbon reinforced composite. The new RL featured extensive aerodynamic design treatment including details such as flush side glass, plus underbody covers and diffusers to reduce lift, resulting in a very low drag coefficient of 0.29.

For 2006, the Acura RL was also offered in a second trim level, the optional 'Technology Package' which included three new features: adaptive cruise control (ACC), Collision Mitigation Braking System, and Michelin PAX System run-flat tires on unique PAX 235 mm x 460 mm A ("A" for asymmetric) aluminum alloy wheels with unique 245-680R460A Michelin Pilot HX MXM 4 all-season Grand Touring type radials designed for the Michelin PAX System. The metric sized, run-flat Michelin PAX System wheels and tires are equivalent to  wheels and 245/45-R18 conventional tires. The previously standard color-matched mud guards were removed in 2006. All 2006 models had a slight change to the navigation system that allowed the installation of an optional rearview camera.  MSRP increased by $200 over the equivalent 2005 model.

For 2007, the Acura RL was offered in three trim levels: a "standard" or "base" package; a newly defined "Technology Package;" and the highest level trim, the "Technology Package with CMBS/PAX."

Base model cars were well equipped, but deleted certain features such as the navigation system and Adaptive Front Lighting System (AFS), and substituted plastic simulated wood for the dashboard maple wood trim.

Technology Package cars were essentially the same as the 2005 and 2006 standard models, coming with navigation and AFS, while adding as standard equipment a rear backup camera and a 3.5 mm stereo input jack for Apple iPod and other MP3-type devices.

The Technology Package plus CMBS/PAX trim level had no 2005 equivalent, though it was most similar to the 2006 Technology Package that had also included ACC/CMBS and PAX technologies.  While the label "CMBS/PAX" might appear to indicate ACC was dropped as a feature, in reality, ACC was an extension of the CMBS system, and so was included.

As noted above, the MP3 audio player feature (usable for any device with a 3.5 mm headphone jack) was added to all trim levels.  An integrated rearview camera was added to the top two trim levels. An integrated rearview camera could be added to the non-navigation Base model as a dealer installed option. The Base model optional rearview camera was installed in the same manner and position as on the 2006 models, mounted dead center in the trunk trim, with the trunk release button displaced to the right of center (passenger side).  The difference was subtle, but the factory rearview camera installation on the Technology Package and the Technology Package with CMBS/PAX is to the left side (driver's side) of the center-mounted trunk release.

In 2005 and 2006, all models came standard with "genuine curly maple wood dashboard trim." With the introduction of three trim levels, the genuine curly maple wood dashboard trim now only appeared on the two higher level cars: the Technology Package and the Technology Package with CMBS/PAX. OnStar was deleted as a feature from all trim levels. Colors were added and deleted. MSRP increased by $100 from the roughly equivalent 2006 trims.

The 2008 Acura RL continued unchanged in the U.S. market from the 2007 model, with three trim levels.  Colors were added and deleted. MSRP increased $500 for each trim:

In Canada, the 2008 Acura RL was available in two different models, Base and Elite Package. The Elite Package added Collision Mitigation Braking System (CMBS), Active Front Lighting System (AFS), Adaptive Cruise Control (ACC), heated and cooled ventilated front seats, and burled maple wood trim.

2005–2008 A-Spec Performance Package

For the 2005–2008 models, Acura offered an A-Spec package for the RL.  The dealer-installed package consisted of a body kit, badging, revised suspension and different wheels.  The package was first announced at a late 2004 Specialty Equipment Market Association (SEMA) trade show in Las Vegas. The A-Spec package for sale was distinctly different from the Acura RL A-Spec Concept Vehicle announced and shown as a striking dark red one-of-a-kind custom creation in early 2005 at the Detroit Auto Show.

The performance part of the package included the A-Spec sport suspension and A-Spec 18-inch alloy wheels, which allowed the use of more sports-oriented lower profile tires.

The A-Spec sport suspension changed out the four spring and damper (shock absorber) strut assemblies. The A-Spec suspension featured lowering springs (approximately 0.75 inch) and revalved dampers. The ride was stiffer, but not overly so, and handling was improved with less body roll, more controlled cornering and enhanced feel. Reportedly Acura chose to make the RL's A-Spec suspension more compliant than the very stiff A-Spec sport suspension upgrade for the Acura TL, in keeping with the two different missions of the cars: luxury for the RL, luxury sport for the TL. Acura RL A-Spec retained the same suspension geometry as the stock Acura RL suspension alignment specifications.

The other A-Spec performance upgrade was A-Spec 18x8 inch alloy wheels, a 10-spoke lightweight design (about the same weight as the 5-spoke 17x8 inch OEM wheels). Recommended tires were either 245/45-18 sized Michelin Pilot Sport PS2 ultra high-performance summer tires or Michelin Pilot Sport A/S ultra-high-performance all-season tires. Alternatively, less sport-oriented Michelin Pilot HX MXM4 Grand Touring All Season tires were also available in the same size.  Typical of Acura optional wheels, the 55 mm offset of the stock 17x8 inch wheels was maintained so that suspension geometry could remain untouched.

The A-Spec appearance package consisted of a front air dam, side skirts, rear bumper air diffuser and a subtle trunk decklid lip style spoiler, all designed to give the car a more aggressive "aero" look.  The parts came pre-painted from the factory to match factory colors.  All parts were dealer installable. If the dealer installed the A-Spec parts at the time of purchase, the original new car warranty of four years/50,000 miles would apply.  If installed after purchase, the normal one year/12,000 mile parts warranty would apply.

As of the 2009 mid-model change, A-Spec options were no longer offered. However, Acura moved to a firmer standard suspension for 2009, plus larger and wider  inch standard wheels and lower-profile 245/45-18 size tires.  More aggressive "aero" look body work was also standard, and a revised trunk decklid spoiler was made available as a dealer installed option.

2009 mid-model change (KB2)

For the 2009 model year, the RL received an extensive mid-model change (MMC), and made its introduction at the Chicago Auto Show on February 6, 2008, billed as "the most extensive Acura MMC ever". The new sedan was designated KB2 in the VIN codes, differentiating it from the 2005–2008 KB1 chassis VIN code. The revised sedan was released on July 1, 2008, to dealerships. While on paper, the engine may seem to be the same unit as shared with the Acura MDX, it is actually a variant that introduces, for the first time ever on an SOHC Honda V6, an implementation of the Honda VTEC variable valve train technology on both intake and exhaust for improved horsepower and torque. Heretofore, all previous SOHC Honda V6 engines with VTEC used the technology on the intake side only. Engine emissions were reduced to meet the stricter U.S. Environmental Protection Agency (EPA) TIER 2 – BIN 5 and California Air Resources Board ULEV-2 standards. Implementation of the SH-AWD was adjusted for earlier intervention and a greater rear-wheel bias for better handling dynamics.

The MMC RL suspension was upgraded with higher-rate coil springs, larger diameter anti-sway bars and stiffer bushings all around.  The MMC RL was equipped with a new larger front anti-sway bar of hollow construction, 30 mm diameter overall with a 6.5 mm wall thickness, and a larger rear solid anti-sway bar, 19 mm in diameter.  The pre-MMC models sported a solid 29 mm front and 17 mm rear sway bar.

Standard 18- x 8-inch seven-spoke alloy wheels with 245/45-18 tires replaced the previous years' 17- x 8-inch five-spoke offerings for not only the Base and Tech package models, but also for the highest trim level, the ACC/CMBS equipped model. Previous years' ACC/CMBS equipped models were equipped with [Michelin PAX System] run-flat tires on 18-inch equivalent (460 mm diameter) five-spoke wheels.

Inside, the front seats were revised for greater comfort and to allow a slight increase in rear leg room. The passenger front seat received the same full 10-way power control as the driver's seat. Both front seats featured active head restraint systems, and the existing seat-heating feature was supplemented by six levels of cooling ventilation. Controls for heating and air conditioning were simplified, and additional individual vent controls were added for the driver and passenger. The shift gear no longer had a gated sequence, but moved straight fore and aft like the ones in the Acura TSX and Acura TL. Simulated woodgrain trim was added to the steering wheel and the top of the shifter, to emphasize the RL's upscale aspirations compared to its less costly TL and TSX siblings.

Additional insulation, improved acoustic isolation windshield design, and a new implementation of the Active Noise Cancellation system (ANC) combined to make the 2009 RL's interior quieter in a variety of conditions. Whereas the former ANC was set to cancel out only low frequency boominess from the engine and exhaust, the MMC system, called Active Sound Control, was expanded in its range to cancel some higher frequency road and tire noise as well. Unlike its predecessor ANC, Active Sound Control was now linked to throttle position and engine RPM to provide a quieter cockpit during normal cruising, yet allowed more of the new 3.7 L engine's "muscular sound" to be heard at higher engine speeds and higher velocities.

An additional microphone as well as some switchable directionality was added to the HFL (Hands Free Link) and Voice Activated Navigation and Convenience controls. When the system was in "accept commands" mode, the new microphone system provided more accurate system "understanding" of the driver's voice. Extraneous sounds, such as other voices in the cabin and wind noise, were better distinguished and filtered out by the dual microphone system. Directionality was removed when an HFL voice call was established, so that all passengers could still participate in a phone call as in the pre-MMC model. The new dual microphone system used real estate in the overhead console that was previously used in the 2005 and 2006 models for OnStar control electronics. The number of voice recognition commands was increased to over 700, up from 560 previously.

The DVD-based navigation system improved on previous XM satellite-linked traffic flow reporting, adding continuously updated real-time weather reporting and the capability to reroute based on current traffic conditions.  The DVD Audio-capable 10-speaker sound system remained, but integration with the audio system was improved with the addition of Bluetooth stereo and a USB port that allowed integration and operation of Apple iPod and other MP3 type devices.  Also new was the ability to display iPod or other MP3 device (such as a USB flash memory device) folder and playlist information on the car's 8-inch central navigation display screen.

New shifter and center console arrangements were added, including a Sport mode. The steering wheel paddle shifters were reprogrammed for faster response, and the paddle shifters could be operated in both Drive and Sport modes.  In pre-MMC models, the gear selector had to be put in manual mode for the paddle shifters to operate.

The height grew by a scant , while the width, track and wheelbase remained the same,. The front end including the hood, and the rear including the trunkline, were revised, and the headlights and taillights redesigned. One of the most controversial features of the 2009 RL was its "Power Plenum" grille design, the first of three similar designs that was soon joined by the second-generation 2009 Acura TSX and the fourth-generation 2009 Acura TL.

Curb weights increased for 2009.  The MMC Base weighed in at 4083 lbs, the Technology Package model 4085 lbs, and the ACC/CMBS with no PAX weighed 4110.  The equivalent 2006 pre-MMC Technology Package had weighed 4012 lbs, and the pre-MMC with ACC/CMBS/PAX weighed 4074 lbs.

MSRP for the 2009 Acura RL increased by $500 over 2008 model for each of its three trim levels. For 2009, the Michelin PAX Run Flat Tire system was no longer offered in combination with the CMBS/ACC package. ACC was now featured alongside CMBS as part of the package name, after a two-year hiatus. In reality, ACC was always included as a part of the CMBS. Colors were also added and deleted.

The 2010 Acura RL continued with few changes in the U.S. from the 2009 model, as indicated on the Acura.com website for the RL. Colors were added and deleted once again, and MSRP increased $150 in each trim:

2011 update 

The 2011 Acura RL added new color combinations and new features: six-speed automatic transmission, power folding mirrors, and rear backup/parking sensors.

The six-speed automatic transmission, first introduced on the 2010 Acura ZDX, finally replaced the RL's five-speed automatic, long criticized by the press as outdated. The transmission upgrade was credited for an EPA gas mileage improvement to 17/24/20 (City/Highway/Combined) an increase of 2 mpg in highway driving.  In addition, 0-60 times were said to decrease by 0.5 seconds, to 6.0 seconds. There have been reports that the 2009 Acura RL Mid Model Change was originally the introduction candidate for the six-speed feature within the Acura lineup, but that the transmission was still undergoing testing and was not yet ready at that time.

Power folding mirrors had been available in markets other than North America since the 2004 introduction in Japan. Parking/backup sensors had been available in the North American market as a dealer installed option since the second generation Acura RL's introduction in late 2004. A host of other features had also been available since the car's introduction in late 2004, some of which are detailed in the Safety section below.

The RL exterior was updated for 2011 with a toned-down version of the controversial "power plenum" front grille. Inside, the RL offered a new interior color (Sea Coast), new Dark Burlwood interior trim, and thin-thread stitching on the steering wheel.

Unique new  diameter 15-spoke aluminum wheels included a new noise quieting technology: a polypropylene "Helmholtz resonator" that encircled the center portion of the inside of the wheel. The resonator served to suppress specific frequencies between 100 and 500 hertz, and in combination with increased floorboard insulation, decreased interior noise by 1.3 dB, or 15%. The Helmholtz resonators in the wheels were touted as a "world's first" for a passenger vehicle. The new wheels appeared to be conventional alloy wheels modified to incorporate an internal noise reduction device. A diagram showed an elastomer-type ring with multiple hollow chambers surrounding the center line of the wheel circumference. This resonator was designed to absorb the resonances generated by rough road surfaces such as highway seams.

2012 update 

The 2012 Acura RL appears to be a carryover from the 2011 refresh with no substantive changes.  Price increases US$1,000. The color Platinum Frost Metallic had been dropped in 2011, but appears to be added back in 2012.

Reception
The second-generation 2005 Acura RL appeared on Car and Driver'''s Ten Best list for 2005.  The car also garnered a CNET.com "Editor's Choice" Award for Top Tech Car and has had been reviewed in 2005, 2006, 2007, 2009, and 2011 as well as 2013 for its successor, the RLX. The SH-AWD all-wheel-drive system was lauded by Popular Science as one of the best automotive innovations of 2004, and earned the 2005 "Tech Car of the Year" from CNET.com. In a comparison of 2006–2007 model year mid-luxury sedans with all-wheel drive (prices ranging from $60,000 to 65,000 CAD), the RL compared favorably to a Mercedes-Benz E300 4MATIC and a BMW 528xi with xDrive. Subsequent moves by both Audi and BMW to design and market their own versions of torque vectoring all-wheel-drive systems bear out the innovative nature of the SH-AWD design.

While critically acclaimed, sales did not meet expectations. Despite the mid-generational update in 2009, only 2,043 cars were sold in the U.S., a 55 percent drop from 2008. Among Japanese luxury flagships marketed in America during the first six months of 2010, Acura sold only 872 RLs, compared to 5,650 Lexus LS and 6,602 Infiniti M sedans. Only 379 RLs were sold in North America in 2012.

Enthusiasts and dealers said that the RL was not competitive because it lacked the full-size dimensions (the back seat was regarded as tight for a car of this size), a V8 engine performance option, and the better handling and balanced rear-wheel drive of its larger rivals in the mid-luxury segment. The 2009 refresh and 2011 update did not keep the RL competitive enough in acceleration or fuel economy, considering that other marques had released new generations of their mid-size luxury sedans, and as the 2009-10 RL retained a five-speed automatic transmission while other rivals had automatics with six or seven gears. Other competitors that were midway through their model cycle, such as the 2004-07 BMW 530i and 2005–08 Audi A6 3.2 FSI (with naturally-aspirated 6-cylinder engines that were less powerful than the Acura RL's 3.5L V6) received updated engines with turbocharging/supercharging; the resulting 2008 BMW 535i and 2009 Audi A6 3.0 TFSI proved more powerful and fuel-efficient than the 2009 Acura RL (with a 3.7L V6). The RL's styling, while generally considered handsome, was not viewed as inspiring or passionate enough to alert buyers to its technological features or stand out in a crowded field, and the 2009 model was criticized for its "power plenum" grille, a bright horizontal pentagon of chrome that formed a shield across the upper center.

Some have suggested that the Acura RL's failure in the market was due to its initial pricing which was perceived to be out of its bracket. Honda Japan believed that the new RL offered more features and performance than the base version of its luxury competitors (i.e., the base six-cylinder BMW 5 Series), and suggested that it could charge more, though Honda Canada disagreed. The RL's initial MRSP was $69,500 CAD, considerably more than the six-cylinder BMW 525i and close to that of the V8-powered 2005 BMW 545i at $70,000 CAD. At the RL's price point, most consumers expected a V8. Furthermore, they did not perceive the Acura brand as being on par with its German rivals (Audi, BMW, Mercedes-Benz) and expected more value from the Japanese marque, particularly with Acura's more expensive offerings (as opposed to entry-level offerings like the Acura TL which were much more successful in their price brackets). The damage from Honda Japan's alleged hubris was done, perhaps giving the RL an unfavorable image that could not be removed, even though Honda Canada has since reduced the RL's price as well as releasing a decontented trim to hit a lower price point. Although other Japanese manufacturers have had limited success in the mid-luxury market which has been dominated by the Germans, the Lexus GS 350 and Infiniti M35 (which debuted around the same time as the second-generation Acura RL) sold considerably better than the Acura RL as they followed a strategy of undercutting the German executive cars with lower pricing and/or more standard features. Late in its production lifespan the RL also faced competition from the Hyundai Genesis which was less expensive yet similarly refined, while featuring rear wheel drive and an optional V8 engine.

In 2009, the new generation of the Acura TL was released. The TL's high performance trim features essentially the same engine (but slightly more horsepower, so Acura advertised the TL as its most powerful car), the SH-AWD system, similar dimensions, and many of the RL's other key features for only $44,900 CAD, causing some to question whether it rendered the costlier RL superfluous in Acura's own showrooms. An auto journalist remarked of the RL's successor, the Acura RLX, saying "Making the RLX bigger fixes nothing. The RL's problem, and now the RLX's, is that the car looks and feels like an exalted, compulsively over-equipped Honda Accord".

Safety
In October 2010, the Acura RL was named by Consumer Reports''  as the most reliable new car among luxury sedans, one of five Honda models so honored in their respective categories. The others were the front-wheel-drive version of the Acura TL among upscale sedans, the Honda CR-V small SUV, the Acura RDX small upscale SUV, and the Honda Ridgeline compact pickup truck.

From 2005 to 2008, Acura RL has been ranked #1 and has achieved the best car safety score (46.4) in Informed for LIFE's "2003–2009 Vehicle risk index SCOREs".  For both the 2009  and 2010  model years, the Acura RL received a five-star crash safety ratings from the National Highway Traffic Safety Administration (NHTSA).  For the 2009 model year, the Acura RL received a Top Safety Pick designation from the Insurance Institute for Highway Safety (IIHS) earning a "Good" — the highest score possible — on frontal offset, side impact and rear crash protection tests. The "Good" scores continued for all tests conducted on the 2010 model.  When a roof strength (rollover) evaluation was added to the battery of tests, the RL was rated only "Marginal" in this category, causing it to lose the Top Safety Pick award.

 The Acura RL consistently garnered National Highway Traffic Safety Administration (NHTSA) Five Star (the highest rating) ratings for Frontal, Side and Rollover crash testing. The injury measures on the driver in the front test were some of the lowest ever recorded in a NHTSA test at the time, and were still considered top notch as of 2010.
 The Acura RL consistently earned a green G for "Good" (the highest rating) in Frontal Offset and Side Impact tests conducted by the Insurance Institute for Highway Safety (IIHS).
 The facelifted 2009 Acura RL has revised head restraints, thus improving the rear crash protection rating for the 2005–2008 models from Marginal to Good for the 2009, and earning it recognition as an IIHS Top Safety Pick.
 The Acura RL incorporated most modern, and some unique, safety features including:
 Advanced Compatibility Engineering (ACE) body structure - ACE features extensive use of high-tensile steel and lightweight aluminum components in a front-mounted polygonal main frame, designed to engage vehicles of differing size and weight in a frontal collision and spread the forces through multiple structural pathways, while preventing or minimizing cabin deformation.  The Acura RL was the launch vehicle for the ACE body structure.  In 2009, all production Acura vehicles featured the ACE body structure.  The ACE body structure is one factor in Acura achieving an all time first in US automotive history, winning simultaneous top marks in both Government National Highway Traffic Safety Administration (NHTSA) and Insurance Institute for Highway Safety (IIHS) crash test ratings
 Super Handling-All Wheel Drive (SH-AWD) - In addition to its performance benefits, the front to rear and side to side torque distribution of SH-AWD works actively to keep the car on the desired line
 Anti-lock Braking System - 3-channel ABS
 Vehicle Stability Assist (Honda Acura version of Vehicle Stability Control) -  4 channel VSA integrated with SH-AWD, ABS, yaw, lateral G, speed and steering angle sensors
 Electronic Traction Control (uses individual wheel ABS sensor and engine modulation)
 Electronic Brake-force Distribution (EBD) (redistributes front and rear brake pressures as the situation dictates)
 Brake Assist - "learns" the driver's braking habits, rate of pressure and total pressure applied, then quickly activates full ABS in a perceived panic stop
 Front Air Bags (2 ea) - including two-stage activation which minimizes injury due to deployment geometry (deploying upward rather than forward into the occupant) and speed
 Front Side Air Bags (2 ea) - including Occupant Position Detection System (OPDS)
 Side Curtain Air Bags (2 ea) - for front and rear passengers
 Occupant Position Detection Sensor (OPDS) system - detects weight and positioning of passenger in the front seat and disables the passenger front side air bag deployment if the system calculates that deployment could cause injury to the occupant, such as a child or small-statured adult
 LATCH child seat anchors
 Tire Pressure Monitoring System (TPMS]) - provides individual pressure readings for each tire and tire position in a graphical display, and alerts the driver in the event of low or no pressure
  bumpers front and back
 Optional Collision Mitigation Braking System (CMBS) (2006-forward)
 Optional Adaptive Cruise Control (ACC) (2006-forward)
 Optional Michelin PAX System run-flat tires (2006–2008)

From the 2006 model year forward, the Acura RL features an optional precrash system called the Collision Mitigation Braking System (CMBS), which can alert drivers of objects up to 330 feet ahead. If the driver gets dangerously close and does not take evasive action, the RL first provides visible and audible alerts. If the driver does not respond, the electronic pretensioning seatbelt system tugs on the shoulder belts. If the driver still does not react and the collision is deemed unavoidable, the RL retracts and locks seatbelts and brakes hard. Depending on the situation, all three stages may blend together as if one.

The same CMBS millimeter wave radar was also used to operate the optional Adaptive Cruise Control (ACC) feature. The driver selected a cruise speed and could set a timed following distance of 2.0, 1.5 or 1.0 seconds. When the ACC detected a target at any distance up to 330 feet ahead, the engine throttle would be modulated to keep the timed following distance. If throttle modulation did not provide enough slowing, the car would also apply the brakes to help maintain the chosen distance.

From 2006 through 2008, Michelin PAX System run-flat tires were also offered as an option.

Michelin PAX System run-flat tires require special equipment to replace them. Such equipment is available only at a limited number of specially certified tire and car dealerships. In April 2008, Michelin announced that it would discontinue its PAX run-flat tires. Unless special equipment is available, the Acura RL's optional run-flat tires are usually fixed by replacing the entire wheel/tire assembly. Unlike Honda dealers, Acura dealers were not required to become PAX certified service centers, which included expensive training and specialized machinery. Acura dealers would generally take a flat tire/wheel assembly off and put a new PAX System on the vehicle, or refer the customer to the nearest PAX certified facility.

For warranty and safety reasons, it is not recommended that owners of PAX equipped vehicles switch to another type of tire assembly. Both Acura and Michelin have not been forthcoming about how current owners of PAX equipped Acura RLs can address this impasse once the current supply of PAX tires run out. Some hope that the PAX tire supply will not run out and that they will be continued to be produced on a specialty basis, just as the ill-fated Michelin TRX system tires are still produced today.

Reasons for discontinuing the PAX run-flat system were several, one big reason probably being the class-action suit against Honda and Michelin.  Other reasons may have been the difficulty in repair and replacement of PAX tires, which are generally special order and require special mount/demount machinery and training, and the paucity of PAX certified dealers throughout the United States.  While RLs have reportedly low incidence of complaints with the premium Michelin Pilot MXM4 all season tires, the opposite was true of the top-of-the-line Honda Odyssey Touring model minivan equipped with Michelin Energy LX4 PAX tires that allegedly did not live up to their promise of long tread life and easy replacement. In addition, during this time, Michelin announced that due to the low general acceptance of the PAX technology throughout the industry, new PAX development would be stopped, although tires would be provided for the foreseeable future. Other PAX equipped vehicles include the world's fastest production car, the Bugatti Veyron EB 16.4, and certain Rolls-Royce and Audi vehicles.

On the safety front, it is also worth noting that the Honda Legend, the name under which the RL is marketed in most of the rest of the world where there is no Acura brand, offers some additional optional safety features. These include Lane Keeping Assistance System (LKAS), Intelligent Night Vision, front bumper mounted cameras to assist in parking and turning, and a standard pop-up hood for pedestrian safety.

The LKAS can, with the assistance of a front windshield mounted CMOS camera, make small steering adjustments using the car's Electric Power Steering (EPS) system to keep a car in its lane so long as the radius of the turn was more than 220 meters, which was the then-legal minimum in Japan.  The LKAS would relinquish control at the slightest steering input by the driver, so the driver retained control at all times.

The night vision system used a separate heads-up type display reflected from the front lower center windshield.  Far infrared technology cameras do not require an infrared light source as near infrared technology cameras do, and the software was able to detect human-like figures, surround the image with a red box and give audible caution tones.

Bumper-mounted cameras gave the driver a view out at each front corner to assist in parking, and also to see the amount of clearance down the road if the car were in an alley-like situation, where driver vision around the corner would require moving much of the car out into the path of possible oncoming traffic.

The pop-up hood used a series of sensors that could detect a pedestrian-like object being thrown onto the hood. An actuator popped the hood up at the rear, close to the windshield, 10 cm (4 inches) to help minimize pedestrian injuries, especially head trauma. RL/Legend models in all markets featured energy-absorbing hood and fender supports and deformable windshield wiper pivots to minimize pedestrian injury.

Recalls

There have been two recalls on the second-generation Acura RL, based on defects in parts used in both Acura and Honda vehicles.

In December 2007, certain 2005–2008 model Acura RLs were subject to a safety recall for the power steering hose. Prolonged high under-hood temperatures may cause the power steering hose to deteriorate prematurely and may cause the hose to crack and leak power steering oil. Oil leaking onto a hot catalytic converter will generate smoke and possibly lead to an under-hood fire.  Affected vehicles were to be inspected and repaired, as applicable, at no charge. Reportedly, this recall extended to both 2005–2008 Acura RL and 2004–2008 Acura TL models.

In December 2010, certain 2005–2007 model Acura RLs were subject to a safety recall for potential leaking of the brake master cylinder seal.  A seal in the brake master cylinder may be susceptible to damage following the use of brake fluid other than the recommended Acura or (Honda) Genuine DOT3 brake fluid.  If the seal is damaged, it can result in a brake fluid leak under certain conditions.  If a leak should occur, the driver might see a low brake fluid indicator light or a BRAKE FLUID LOW or CHECK BRAKE SYSTEM message.  If the driver continues to drive the vehicle after receiving this message without refilling the brake fluid reservoir, it could result in a brake pedal that feels soft or spongy, and may eventually affect braking performance, increasing the risk of a crash.  Affected vehicles were to be inspected and repaired, as applicable, at no charge. Reportedly, this recall applied to both 2005–2007 Acura RL and 2005–2007 Honda Odyssey models.

Successor
In April 2012, the Acura RLX concept was introduced by Honda, and the production model debuted at the Los Angeles Auto Show. The initial available trim of the RLX will be front-wheel drive; later the all-wheel drive version will be released featuring a 377-horsepower hybrid engine mated to a seven-speed dual-clutch transmission.

Sales

Sources

External links

Acura USA
Official page of RL model

RL
All-wheel-drive vehicles
Executive cars
Flagship vehicles
Full-size vehicles
Front-wheel-drive vehicles
Sports sedans
2000s cars
2010s cars
Cars introduced in 1996